The legislative districts of Zamboanga City are the representations of the highly urbanized city of Zamboanga in the various national legislatures of the Philippines. The city is currently represented in the lower house of the Congress of the Philippines through its first and second congressional districts.

History 

Prior to gaining separate representation, areas now under the jurisdiction of Zamboanga City were represented under the Department of Mindanao and Sulu (1917–1935), Zamboanga Province (1935–1953), Zamboanga del Sur (1953–1972) and Region IX (1978–1984).

Having been re-classified as a highly urbanized city on November 22, 1983, Zamboanga City was granted separate representation for the first time in 1984, when it returned one representative, elected at large, to the Regular Batasang Pambansa.

Under the new Constitution which was proclaimed on February 11, 1987, the city constituted a lone congressional district, and elected its member to the restored House of Representatives starting that same year.

The enactment of Republic Act No. 9269 on March 19, 2004 increased Zamboanga City's representation by reapportioning it into two congressional districts, which began to elect their separate representatives in the 2007 elections. Veterans Avenue forms a significant portion of the boundary line between the two districts.

1st District 
Barangays: Ayala, Bagong Calarian, Baliwasan, Baluno, Cabatangan, Camino Nuevo, Campo Islam, Canelar, Capisan, Cawit, Dulian (Upper Pasonanca), La Paz, Labuan, Limpapa, Maasin, Malagutay, Mariki, Pamucutan, Pasonanca, Patalon, Recodo, Rio Hondo, San Jose Cawa-Cawa, San Jose Gusu, San Roque, Santa Barbara, Santa Maria, Santo Niño, Sinubung, Sinunuc, Talisayan, Tulungatung, Tumaga, Zone 1, Zone 2, Zone 3, Zone 4
Population (2020):  448,390

2nd District 
Barangays: Arena Blanco, Boalan, Bolong, Buenavista, Bunguiao, Busay, Cabaluay, Cacao, Calabasa, Culianan, Curuan, Dita, Divisoria, Dulian (Upper Bunguiao), Guisao, Guiwan, Kasanyangan, Lamisahan, Landang Gua, Landang Laum, Lanzones, Lapakan, Latuan, Licomo, Limaong, Lubigan, Lumayang, Lumbangan, Lunzuran, Mampang, Manalipa, Mangusu, Manicahan, Mercedes, Muti, Pangapuyan, Panubigan, Pasilmanta, Pasobolong, Putik, Quiniput, Salaan, Sangali, Santa Catalina, Sibulao, Tagasilay, Taguiti, Talabaan, Talon-Talon, Taluksangay, Tetuan, Tictapul, Tigbalabag, Tictabon, Tolosa, Tugbungan, Tumalutap, Tumitus, Victoria, Vitali, Zambowood
Population (2020):  528,844

Lone District (defunct)

At-Large (defunct) 

Notes

See also 
Legislative district of Mindanao and Sulu
Legislative district of Zamboanga
Legislative district of Zamboanga del Sur

References 

Zamboanga City
Politics of Zamboanga City